Mesembryanthemum is a genus of flowering plants in the family Aizoaceae; like many members of this family, it is characterized by long-lasting flower heads. Flowers of Mesembryanthemum protect their gametes from night-time dews or frosts but open in sunlight. There is an obvious evolutionary advantage to doing this; where sun, dew, frost, wind or predators are likely to damage exposed reproductive organs, closing may be advantageous during times when flowers are unlikely to attract pollinators. It is indigenous to southern Africa.

Many Mesembryanthemum species are known as ice plants because of the glistening globular bladder cells covering their stems, fruit and leaves, "... they sparkle like ice crystals". In South Africa, Mesembryanthemums are known as "vygies" (from Afrikaans "vy"), although this term refers to many plants in the family Aizoaceae.

Species formerly placed in Mesembryanthemum have been transferred to other genera, such as Cleretum and Carpobrotus, although sources differ.

Etymology
Carl Linnaeus used the Dillenius spelling (with the "y") in his description of the Mesembryanthemum species and the International Code of Botanical Nomenclature requires the retention of the original, deliberate spelling.

Uses
Mesembryanthemums are often cultivated as ornamental plants for their showy flowers. Ornamental plants may escape into the wild and consequently have become widely naturalized outside their native range. They are considered an invasive weed in certain places.

Culture and society
Some Mesembryanthemum species are thought to be hallucinogenic plants, like related Aizoaceae, and as such may be subject to legal restrictions (e.g. Louisiana State Act 159).

Species
, Plants of the World Online accepted the following species:

Mesembryanthemum aitonis Jacq.
Mesembryanthemum alatum (L.Bolus) L.Bolus
Mesembryanthemum amabile (Gerbaulet & Struck) Klak
Mesembryanthemum amplectens L.Bolus
Mesembryanthemum archeri (L.Bolus) Klak
Mesembryanthemum arenarium (N.E.Br.) L.Bolus
Mesembryanthemum articulatum Thunb.
Mesembryanthemum barklyi N.E.Br.
Mesembryanthemum baylissii (L.Bolus) Klak
Mesembryanthemum bicorne Sond.
Mesembryanthemum brevicarpum (L.Bolus) Klak
Mesembryanthemum bulletrapense Klak
Mesembryanthemum canaliculatum Haw.
Mesembryanthemum caudatum L.Bolus
Mesembryanthemum chrysophthalmum (Gerbaulet & Struck) Klak
Mesembryanthemum clandestinum Haw.
Mesembryanthemum corallinum Thunb.
Mesembryanthemum cordifolium L.f.
Mesembryanthemum coriarium Burch.
Mesembryanthemum crassicaule Haw.
Mesembryanthemum cryptanthum Hook.f.
Mesembryanthemum crystallinum L.
Mesembryanthemum deciduum (L.Bolus) Klak
Mesembryanthemum decurvatum (L.Bolus) Klak
Mesembryanthemum delum L.Bolus
Mesembryanthemum digitatum Aiton
Mesembryanthemum dimorphum Welw. ex Oliv.
Mesembryanthemum dinteri Engl.
Mesembryanthemum emarcidum Thunb.
Mesembryanthemum englishiae L.Bolus
Mesembryanthemum eurystigmatum Gerbaulet
Mesembryanthemum exalatum (Gerbaulet) Klak
Mesembryanthemum excavatum L.Bolus
Mesembryanthemum expansum L.
Mesembryanthemum fastigiatum Thunb.
Mesembryanthemum flavidum Klak
Mesembryanthemum gariepense (Gerbaulet & Struck) Klak
Mesembryanthemum gariusanum Dinter
Mesembryanthemum geniculiflorum L.
Mesembryanthemum gessertianum Dinter & A.Berger
Mesembryanthemum glareicola (Klak) Klak
Mesembryanthemum granulicaule Haw.
Mesembryanthemum grossum Aiton
Mesembryanthemum guerichianum Pax
Mesembryanthemum haeckelianum A.Berger
Mesembryanthemum holense Klak
Mesembryanthemum hypertrophicum Dinter
Mesembryanthemum inachabense Engl.
Mesembryanthemum junceum Haw.
Mesembryanthemum juttae Dinter & A.Berger
Mesembryanthemum knolfonteinense Klak
Mesembryanthemum kuntzei Schinz
Mesembryanthemum ladismithiense Klak
Mesembryanthemum lancifolium (L.Bolus) Klak
Mesembryanthemum latipetalum (L.Bolus) Klak
Mesembryanthemum leptarthron A.Berger
Mesembryanthemum lignescens (L.Bolus) Klak
Mesembryanthemum ligneum (L.Bolus) Klak
Mesembryanthemum lilliputanum Klak
Mesembryanthemum longipapillosum Dinter
Mesembryanthemum longistylum DC.
Mesembryanthemum marlothii Pax
Mesembryanthemum namibense Marloth
Mesembryanthemum napierense Klak
Mesembryanthemum neglectum (S.M.Pierce & Gerbaulet) Klak
Mesembryanthemum neofoliosum Klak
Mesembryanthemum nitidum Haw.
Mesembryanthemum noctiflorum L.
Mesembryanthemum nodiflorum L.
Mesembryanthemum nucifer (Ihlenf. & Bittrich) Klak
Mesembryanthemum occidentale Klak
Mesembryanthemum oculatum N.E.Br.
Mesembryanthemum oubergense (L.Bolus) Klak
Mesembryanthemum pallens Aiton
Mesembryanthemum parviflorum Jacq.
Mesembryanthemum paulum (N.E.Br.) L.Bolus
Mesembryanthemum pellitum Friedrich
Mesembryanthemum prasinum (L.Bolus) Klak
Mesembryanthemum pseudoschlichtianum (S.M.Pierce & Gerbaulet) Klak
Mesembryanthemum quartziticola Klak
Mesembryanthemum rabiei (L.Bolus) Klak
Mesembryanthemum rapaceum Jacq.
Mesembryanthemum resurgens Kensit
Mesembryanthemum rhizophorum Klak
Mesembryanthemum salicornioides Pax
Mesembryanthemum schenckii Schinz
Mesembryanthemum schlichtianum Sond.
Mesembryanthemum serotinum (L.Bolus) Klak
Mesembryanthemum sinuosum L.Bolus
Mesembryanthemum sladenianum L.Bolus
Mesembryanthemum spinuliferum Haw.
Mesembryanthemum splendens L.
Mesembryanthemum springbokense Klak
Mesembryanthemum stenandrum (L.Bolus) L.Bolus
Mesembryanthemum subnodosum A.Berger
Mesembryanthemum subtruncatum L.Bolus
Mesembryanthemum suffruticosum (L.Bolus) Klak
Mesembryanthemum tenuiflorum Jacq.
Mesembryanthemum tetragonum Thunb.
Mesembryanthemum theurkauffii (Maire) Maire
Mesembryanthemum tomentosum Klak
Mesembryanthemum tortuosum L.
Mesembryanthemum trichotomum Thunb.
Mesembryanthemum vaginatum Lam.
Mesembryanthemum vanheerdei (L.Bolus) Klak
Mesembryanthemum vanrensburgii (L.Bolus) Klak
Mesembryanthemum varians Haw.
Mesembryanthemum viridiflorum Aiton

Gallery

Legal status

United States

Louisiana
Except for ornamental purposes, growing, selling or possessing any species of Mesembryanthemum is prohibited by Louisiana State Act 159.

See also
 N. E. Brown
 The botanical family Aizoaceae, also called Mesembryanthemaceae

Notes and references

 
Webster's Revised Unabridged Dictionary (1913)

External links

 
Aizoaceae genera
Flora of South Africa
Fynbos
Succulent plants
Barilla plants